Illinois River is a tributary of the Michigan River, approximately  long, in Jackson County in north central Colorado. It drains part of the North Park basin south of Walden.

The Illinois River starts in the Never Summer Mountains near the continental divide, just south of Farview Mountain. It flows northward through the valley as a winding stream, past Rand. It passes under State Highway 14 just southeast of Walden and joins the Michigan from the north just north of Walden. A portion of the valley of the river south of Walden is located within the Arapaho National Wildlife Refuge.

See also
List of rivers of Colorado

References

Rivers of Jackson County, Colorado
Rivers of Colorado